Pradeep Rangaswamy Kumar (born 12 May 1986) is an Indian playback singer and music director who has worked in Tamil language films. After beginning his career as a Carnatic musician, in the 2010s, he has regularly collaborated with composers Santhosh Narayanan and Sean Roldan.

Career
Born to a police inspector father and a music teacher mother, Pradeep Kumar grew up in Tiruchirappalli, Tamil Nadu. His mother, Lalitha Vijayakumar, taught Carnatic music through private lessons and at a government school in the area, meaning that Pradeep Kumar was constantly exposed to Carnatic music as a youngster and often joined his mother in singing at home. He later was introduced as a playback singer in Tamil cinema through the film Attakathi 
by Santhosh Narayanan He later began studying music under J. Venkataraman from the Aalathur School of music, who became his first guru.

Outside music, Pradeep Kumar studied science, wrote the engineering entrance examination and joined an engineering college in Thanjavur hoping to become a theoretical physicist. However, after a week, he decided to opt out of college. As a backup career plan, he instead pursued a diploma course in audio engineering, which also taught him more about sound composition. In 2003, Pradeep Kumar visited Chennai to participate in a competition conducted by the music studio, Carnatica. K. Shashikiran of Carnatica heard him sing and requested that he stay back in Chennai and subsequently from 2003 to 2005, Pradeep Kumar stayed in Chennai to collaborate with Carnita, and his parents joined him later. He continued to perform in katcheris across Chennai and abroad, while also briefly serving as the secretary of the Youth Association of Classical Music, Chennai. Pradeep Kumar later became nuanced in western classical music after apprenticing with Augustin Paul, and also worked as an audio engineer for four years. In 2014, he worked on a documentary called Arunagiri Perumale, which was a live concert recording of a three-piece Indian band along with a 16-piece chamber symphony orchestra, which had taken place in 2014, in Boston. He described the venture as his "pet project", and relied on crowd-funding to get it completed by 2017. During the same period, he married his fellow singer, Kalyani Nair. He also worked as a composer on his first film album for the Telugu project, Maine Pyar Kiya (2014).

Through his work as a musician, Pradeep Kumar became acquainted with composer Santhosh Narayanan. The pair had first met in Trichy when Pradeep Kumar was 18 and then continued to jam together, while studying for the same course in audio engineering. After Santhosh Narayanan became a film composer, Pradeep Kumar regularly worked as his acoustic guitarist. He later featured prominently as a singer, often collaborating with Santhosh Narayanan and another friend Sean Roldan in their albums including Jigarthanda (2014), Irudhi Suttru (2016) and Kabali (2016). He had also worked as a lyricist in Jigarthanda. In 2016, a music critic from The Hindu labelled the three as "the new-age musical trio of Tamil cinema".

In 2017, Pradeep Kumar made his debut as a music composer in Tamil cinema after Santhosh Narayanan had convinced the producers of Meyaadha Maan to allow him to work on the film. Subsequently, Rathna Kumar who directed Meyaadha Maan selected him as a music director for Amala Paul's next film, Aadai.

Discography

Composer

Playback singer

Singles

Awards
 Kerala State Film Awards

 Ananda Vikatan Cinema Awards

 Filmfare Awards South

 South Indian International Movie Awards

 Vijay Awards

 Norway Tamil Film Festival Awards

 Behindwoods Gold Medal

References

External links

1986 births
Indian male playback singers
Living people
Singers from Chennai
Tamil playback singers
Tamil film score composers
Musicians from Tiruchirappalli
Filmfare Awards South winners
Indian male film score composers